The 2018 European Darts Open was the first of thirteen PDC European Tour events on the 2018 PDC Pro Tour. The tournament took place at Ostermann-Arena, Leverkusen, Germany, between 23–25 March 2018. It featured a field of 48 players and £135,000 in prize money, with £25,000 going to the winner.

This was the first event in the PDC European Tour where the format of the semi-finals and final were slightly altered. As in previous years, the first 3 rounds of action, plus the quarter-finals were all best of 11 legs matches, but the semi-finals became best of 13 legs matches, and the final became a best of 15 legs match.

Peter Wright was the defending champion after defeating Mervyn King 6–2 in the final of the 2017 tournament. He reached the final of this tournament, but he was defeated by Michael van Gerwen 8–7 in the first best of 15 legs final.

Prize money
This is how the prize money is divided:

Prize money will count towards the PDC Order of Merit, the ProTour Order of Merit and the European Tour Order of Merit, with one exception: should a seeded player lose in the second round (last 32), their prize money will not count towards any Orders of Merit, although they still receive the full prize money payment.

Qualification and format 
The top 16 entrants from the PDC ProTour Order of Merit on 6 February will automatically qualify for the event and will be seeded in the second round.

The remaining 32 places will go to players from five qualifying events – 18 from the UK Qualifier (held in Barnsley on 16 February), eight from the West/South European Qualifier (held on 22 March), four from the Host Nation Qualifier (held on 22 March), one from the Nordic & Baltic Qualifier (held on 26 January) and one from the East European Qualifier (held on 26 January).

The following players will take part in the tournament:

Top 16
  Michael van Gerwen (champion)
  Peter Wright (runner-up)
  Michael Smith (third round)
  Rob Cross (third round)
  Daryl Gurney (second round)
  Mensur Suljović (third round)
  Joe Cullen (quarter-finals)
  Simon Whitlock (quarter-finals)
  Dave Chisnall (third round)
  Kim Huybrechts (second round)
  Mervyn King (quarter-finals)
  Ian White (second round)
  Gerwyn Price (second round)
  Jelle Klaasen (second round)
  Kyle Anderson (second round)
  Alan Norris (third round)

UK Qualifier
  Ritchie Edhouse (first round)
  Steve Beaton (first round)
  Luke Humphries (first round)
  John Henderson (third round)
  Jonny Clayton (first round)
  James Wade (semi-finals)
  Richard North (semi-finals)
  Adrian Lewis (second round)
  Cameron Menzies (second round)
  Ryan Meikle (first round)
  Justin Pipe (third round)
  Luke Woodhouse (second round)
  Wayne Jones (first round)
  Mark Wilson (first round)
  Jamie Hughes (second round)
  Martin Atkins (first round)
  Chris Dobey (third round)
  Darren Johnson (second round)

West/South European Qualifier
  Vincent van der Voort (first round)
  Michael Rasztovits (first round)
  Ron Meulenkamp (quarter-finals)
  Jermaine Wattimena (second round)
  Jeffrey de Zwaan (first round)
  Jan Dekker (first round)
  Dimitri Van den Bergh (first round)
  Danny Noppert (second round)

Host Nation Qualifier
  Gabriel Clemens (second round)
  Max Hopp (first round)
  Maik Langendorf (first round)
  Thomas Junghans (first round)

Nordic & Baltic Qualifier
  Marko Kantele (second round) 

East European Qualifier
  Tytus Kanik (second round)

Draw

References 

2018 PDC European Tour
2018 in German sport
Leverkusen
March 2018 sports events in Germany